Cotalpa subcribrata is a beetle of the family Scarabaeidae.

Gallery

References 

Rutelinae